Qurimarka (Quechua quri gold, marka village / storey) is an archaeological site in Peru. It is situated in the Apurímac Region, Abancay Province, Huanipaca District.

See also 
 Inka Raqay

References 

Archaeological sites in Peru
Archaeological sites in Apurímac Region